Yonder Román García Álvarez (born 26 February 1993) is a Cuban volleyball player. He is part of the Cuba men's national volleyball team. On club level he plays for El Ahly.

References

External links
 profile at FIVB.org
 profile at volleybox.net

1993 births
Living people
Cuban men's volleyball players
Place of birth missing (living people)
Volleyball players at the 2010 Summer Youth Olympics
Olympic volleyball players of Cuba
Volleyball players at the 2016 Summer Olympics
Pan American Games medalists in volleyball
Pan American Games silver medalists for Cuba
Volleyball players at the 2019 Pan American Games
Youth Olympic gold medalists for Cuba
Medalists at the 2019 Pan American Games
21st-century Cuban people
Cuban expatriate sportspeople in Egypt
Expatriate volleyball players in Egypt
Al Ahly (men's volleyball) players